Norman (Nicholas) Scott (August 10, 1889 – November 13, 1942) was a rear admiral in the United States Navy, and was one of only two U.S. Navy admirals killed in action during a surface battle in World War II. He was one of five flag officers of the U.S. Navy to die in World War II, the others being Isaac C. Kidd, Daniel J. Callaghan, Henry M. Mullinnix, and Theodore E. Chandler.

He was killed along with many of his staff when the ship he was on - the USS Atlanta  - was hit by gunfire from the heavy cruiser USS San Francisco during the nighttime fighting in the Naval Battle of Guadalcanal. Scott posthumously received the Medal of Honor for his actions in the Pacific Theater of World War II.

Biography
Scott was born August 10, 1889 in Indianapolis, Indiana. Appointed to the Naval Academy in 1907, he graduated four years later and received his commission as ensign in March 1912. During 1911–13, Ensign Scott served in the battleship , then served in destroyers and related duty. In December 1917, he was executive officer of  when she was sunk by a German submarine and was commended for his performance at that time. During the rest of World War I, Lieutenant Scott had duty in the Navy Department and as Naval Aide to President Woodrow Wilson. In 1919, while holding the temporary rank of lieutenant commander, he was in charge of a division of Eagle Boats (PE) and commanded Eagle PE-2 and Eagle PE-3.

During the first years of the 1920s, Norman Scott served afloat in destroyers and in the battleship  and ashore in Hawaii. From 1924 to 1930, he was assigned to the staff of Commander Battle Fleet and as an instructor at the Naval Academy. After a tour as executive officer of the light cruiser , Commander Scott was a member of the U.S. Naval Mission to Brazil in 1937–39. Following promotion to the rank of captain, he was commanding officer of the heavy cruiser  until shortly after the United States entered World War II in December 1941.

Captain Scott was assigned to the Office of the Chief of Naval Operations during the first months of 1942. After becoming a rear admiral in May, he was sent to the south Pacific, where he commanded a fire support group during the invasion of Guadalcanal and Tulagi in early August. Rear Admiral Scott continued to lead surface task units for the next three months, as the campaign to hold Guadalcanal intensified. He was present during the Battle of Savo Island on the cruiser , albeit miles from the action. In September 1942, he was named commander of Task Force 64, a mixed cruiser and destroyer surface warfare unit. The combat-minded, pugilistic Scott thoroughly trained and drilled his combat group in gunnery, maneuvers, and night fighting
.  This training paid off when, on 11–12 October 1942, he led his force to victory in the Battle of Cape Esperance, the U.S. Navy's first surface victory of the campaign.  He maneuvered his ships so as to successfully perform the classically desired "Crossing the T" of the opposing Japanese force.

A month later, on November 13, he was second-in-command during the initial night action of the Naval Battle of Guadalcanal. Many felt, at the time and with hindsight, that the fighting-minded and experienced Scott would have made a more effective overall commander of the US force than inexperienced first-in-command Daniel J. Callaghan, and that Scott perhaps would not have made some of  Callaghan's mistakes. During that engagement, Rear Admiral Norman Scott was killed in action when the bridge of his flagship, the light cruiser , was inadvertently struck by gunfire from Callaghan's flagship, the heavy cruiser , which joined with an enemy torpedo to fatally damage the Atlanta. For his "extraordinary heroism and conspicuous intrepidity" in the October and November battles, he posthumously received the Medal of Honor.

As with his fellow Admiral Callaghan, Admiral Scott was buried at sea.

Namesakes
The Scott Center Annex, adjacent to Norfolk Naval Shipyard in Portsmouth Virginia, is named for him. The Norman Scott Natatorium at the United States Naval Academy in Annapolis, Maryland is named for him for being instrumental in introducing intercollegiate swimming to the Naval Academy as a midshipmen. Norman Scott Road on Naval Base San Diego and Training Support Center Great Lakes also honors his memory.

Medal of Honor citation

For extraordinary heroism and conspicuous intrepidity above and beyond the call of duty during action against enemy Japanese forces off Savo Island on the night of 11–12 October and again on the night of 12–13 November 1942. In the earlier action, intercepting a Japanese Task Force intent upon storming our island positions and landing reinforcements at Guadalcanal, Rear Adm. Scott, with courageous skill and superb coordination of the units under his command, destroyed 8 hostile vessels and put the others to flight. Again challenged, a month later, by the return of a stubborn and persistent foe, he led his force into a desperate battle against tremendous odds, directing close-range operations against the invading enemy until he himself was killed in the furious bombardment by their superior firepower. On each of these occasions his dauntless initiative, inspiring leadership and judicious foresight in a crisis of grave responsibility contributed decisively to the rout of a powerful invasion fleet and to the consequent frustration of a formidable Japanese offensive. He gallantly gave his life in the service of his country.

See also

List of Medal of Honor recipients for World War II
List of United States Naval Academy alumni (Medal of Honor)

References

External links

United States Navy personnel of World War I
United States Navy personnel killed in World War II
United States Navy Medal of Honor recipients
United States Naval Academy alumni
United States Navy rear admirals (upper half)
United States Navy World War II admirals
1889 births
1942 deaths
Burials at sea
People from Indianapolis
World War II recipients of the Medal of Honor
Military aides to the President of the United States
Military personnel from Indiana
Military personnel killed by friendly fire